Skradin is a small town in the Šibenik-Knin County of Croatia, with a population of 3,825 (2011 census). The main attraction of the park, Slapovi Krke, is a series of waterfalls, the biggest of which, Skradinski buk, was named after Skradin.

History
It was a Liburnian city, named Scardon.
Later it became a Roman town (Scardona in Latin), as the administrative and military centre of the region. It was destroyed during the Migration Period, and had by the 9th century been settled by Slavs.

During the 10th century, it was one of the fortified towns in Croatia, as the centre of the Skradin županija.

Skradin under Šubić rule

In the late 13th and early 14th centuries, Skradin flourished as the capital of the Šubić bans, Paul I and Mladen II. The Šubić's built the Turina fortress on the hill overlooking the Skradin harbor. They elevated the settlement below the fortress to a free city, at which point it also became a commune, and was granted its own statute and administration. They further enriched the city by constructing several richly-endowed monasteries which housed the Dominicans, Franciscans and other Christian orders.

Decline and Ottoman conquest

Between 1522 and 1684 it was ruled by the Ottoman Empire, then again up to 1794 by the Republic of Venice.

In October 1683, the population of Venetian Dalmatia, principally Uskoks of Ravni kotari, took arms and together with the rayah (lower class) of the Ottoman frontier regions rose up, taking Skradin, Karin, Vrana, Benkovac and Obrovac.

Later, it was occupied by Napoleon as part of the French Empire, then Austria-Hungary.

In time it lost its importance as the centre of the region, which shifted to Šibenik, and so it stagnated - the Diocese of Skradin was abandoned in 1828.

Population

The population of the municipality is divided into the following settlements:
 Bićine, population 174
 Bratiškovci, population 251
 Bribir, population 103
 Cicvare, population 18
 Dubravice, population 594
 Gorice, population 27
 Gračac, population 179
 Ićevo, population 59
 Krković, population 189
 Lađevci, population 112
 Međare, population 6
 Piramatovci, population 275
 Plastovo, population 204
 Rupe, population 470
 Skradin, population 588
 Skradinsko Polje, population 46
 Sonković, population 336
 Vaćani, population 120
 Velika Glava, population 29
 Žažvić, population 30
 Ždrapanj, population 15

Notable people
Rüstem Pasha

References

External links
 

Cities and towns in Croatia
Populated places in Šibenik-Knin County
Cities in ancient Illyria
Illyrian Croatia